Virginia's 56th House of Delegates district elects one of 100 seats in the Virginia House of Delegates, the lower house of the state's bicameral legislature. District 56 includes Louisa County, as well as portions of Goochland, Henrico, and Spotsylvania counties. It has been represented by Republican John McGuire III since 2018.

References

External links
 

Louisa County, Virginia
Goochland County, Virginia
Government in Henrico County, Virginia
Spotsylvania County, Virginia
Virginia House of Delegates districts